Her American Husband is a 1918 American silent drama film directed by E. Mason Hopper and starring Teddy Sampson, Darrell Foss and Leota Lorraine.

Cast
 Teddy Sampson as Cherry Blossom 
 Darrell Foss as Herbert Franklyn 
 Leota Lorraine as Miriam Faversham 
 Kisaburô Kurihara as Tokimasa 
 Misao Seki as Yoshisada 
 Yutaka Abe as Kato Nakamura 
 Will Jeffries as Mason 
 Arthur Millett as Abott 
 Ludwig Lowry as Jessop 
 Kathleen Emerson as Dolly Varden

References

Bibliography
 Robert B. Connelly. The Silents: Silent Feature Films, 1910-36. December Press, 1998.

External links
 

1918 films
1918 drama films
1910s English-language films
American silent feature films
Silent American drama films
American black-and-white films
Films directed by E. Mason Hopper
Triangle Film Corporation films
1910s American films